Saulo Rodrigues dos Santos (born February 18, 1982), known as Saulo, is a Brazilian footballer who plays for Santa Helena as a striker.

References

External links
Saulo at ZeroZero

1982 births
Living people
Brazilian footballers
Brazilian expatriate footballers
F.C. Maia players
Rio Ave F.C. players
Associação Naval 1º de Maio players
C.F. Os Belenenses players
Associação Académica de Coimbra – O.A.F. players
RC Celta de Vigo players
AEP Paphos FC players
América Futebol Clube (PE) players
Clube Recreativo e Atlético Catalano players
Esporte Clube Rio Verde players
Santa Helena Esporte Clube players
Primeira Liga players
Segunda División players
Cypriot First Division players
Expatriate footballers in Spain
Brazilian expatriate sportspeople in Spain
Expatriate footballers in Cyprus
Brazilian expatriate sportspeople in Cyprus
Association football forwards
Sportspeople from Goiás